Almoxatone (MD-780,236) is a selective and reversible inhibitor of MAO-B. It was patented as an antidepressant and antiparkinsonian agent but was never marketed.

See also 
 Monoamine oxidase inhibitor

References 

Antidepressants
Monoamine oxidase inhibitors
3-(4-methoxyphenyl)-2-oxazolidinones
Chloroarenes